Sun Qi (born 11 August 1999) is a Chinese para-snowboarder who competes in the SB-LL2 category.

Career
He competed at the 2018 World Para Snowboard World Cup in Landgraaf, Netherlands where he became the first Chinese player to win an international para-snowboarding gold medal.

He represented China at the 2018 Winter Paralympics in PyeongChang, China, where he finished in 11th place in the banked slalom and snowboard cross events. He again represented China at the 2022 Winter Paralympics in Beijing, China and won a gold medal in the banked slalom event.

References 

1999 births
Living people
Chinese male snowboarders
Paralympic snowboarders of China
Snowboarders at the 2018 Winter Paralympics
Snowboarders at the 2022 Winter Paralympics
Medalists at the 2022 Winter Paralympics
Paralympic medalists in snowboarding
Paralympic gold medalists for China